Abraxas notata is a species of moth belonging to the family Geometridae. It was described by Warren in 1894. It is known from the Nilgiri Hills in India.

References

Abraxini
Moths of Asia
Moths described in 1894